Gary T. Erbe (born 1944) is an American oil painter. He is self-taught, and he is best known for his trompe-l'œils. His work has been exhibited at the Canton Museum of Art, the Brinton Museum, the Boca Raton Museum of Art, the Heckscher Museum of Art, the Baum School of Art and the Reading Public Museum.

Background
Erbe's interest in art began at a young age when he became fascinated by the illustrations in his school textbooks. Erbe's stepfather, Frank Schaefer, encouraged and supported Erbe's interest in art and bought him his first art set. When Erbe was fifteen, his stepfather died and, in the following decade, Erbe produced very little art.

At age sixteen, Erbe dropped out of school, and moved into a studio apartment in Weehawken, New Jersey. Shortly after, Erbe met Edny, whom he married in 1963. One year later, she and Erbe had their first child, Kim, and five years later had their second child, contemporary artist Chantell Van Erbé. To support his family, Erbe worked as an apprentice at an engraving company and painted in his spare time.

Erbe was particularly inspired by artists like William Michael Harnett and John F. Peto, who applied the trompe-l'œil approach to their paintings. Trompe-l'œil translates to "fool the eye", alluding to the way in which three-dimensional objects are rendered on a two dimensional surface.  His work from the 60s involves assemblages of objects which have a thematic relationship with each other. Both the paintings and the assemblages which he paints are Erbe's masterpieces, and the assemblages have been included in his shows.

In 1969, Erbe explored a more contemporary method to trompe-l'œil called Levitational Realism, in which the objects in his paintings appear to be floating. In the following year, he quit his job as an engraver in hopes of becoming a full-time artist.

In 1978, Erbe and Edny split and Erbe moved into his own studio in Union City. Through a mutual friend he met Anna Vedovelli, a local artist who lived nearby. The two married in 1979 but divorced three years later.

By 1996, Erbe was married to Zeny Santos. They lived in his studio in Union City until 2006, moved to a condominium in Hoboken, New Jersey for three years, and now reside in Nutley, New Jersey.

Since 1970, Erbe's work has been exhibited extensively in group and solo exhibitions. His work is in the permanent collections of various well-regarded institutions.

In 2016, The Butler Institute of American Art published a 300-page book on Erbe entitled Footprints: The Art and Life of Gary Erbe.

Selected collections

Butler Institute of American Art
Brandywine River Museum
Canton Museum of Art
Springfield Art Museum
Phoenix Art Museum
Brinton Museum
Montclair Art Museum
New Jersey State Museum
Woodmere Art Museum
New Britain Museum of American Art
The National Arts Club, NY 
Salmagundi Club, NY
Boca Raton Museum of Art
John F. Peto Studio Museum
Heckscher Museum of Art

Selected solo exhibitions

1970, Pace Gallery, Houston, TX
1971, Veldman Gallery, Wisconsin
1976, The New Britain Museum of American Art, CT
1976, NJ Center for Visual Arts, NJ
1979, General Electric World Headquarters, CT
1982, The Alexander Gallery, New York
1983, New Jersey State Museum, NJ
1985, The Butler Institute of American Art, OH
1985, Sordoni Art Gallery, PA
1985, The Alexander Gallery, New York
1988, The Montclair Art Museum, NJ
1988, The Canton Museum of Art, OH
1988, The Westmoreland Museum of American Art, PA
1988, The Woodmere Art Museum, PA
1995, The Butler Institute of American Art, OH
1995, The New Britain Museum of American Art, CT
1995, The James A. Michener Art Museum, PA
1995, Boca Raton Museum of Art, FL
1998, ACA Gallery, New York
1999, Springfield Art Museum, OH
2000, The National Arts Club Grand Gallery, New York
2003, Harmon Meek Gallery, Fl
2008–09, Albuquerque Museum, NM
2009, The Butler Institute of American Art, OH, 40 year Retrospective
2009, Salmagundi Club, New York
2009, Boca Raton Museum of Art, FL, 40 Year Retrospective
2013, The Butler Institute of American Art, OH
2015, Canton Museum of Art, OH
2015, The Baum School of Art, PA
2016, Heckscher Museum of Art, New York
2016, Jonathan Boos Gallery, New York
2017, The Butler Institute of American Art, OH, 50 Year Retrospective
2017, Brinton Museum, WY, 50 Year Retrospective
2018, Reading Public Museum, PA, 50 Year Retrospective
2019, John F. Peto Studio Museum, NJ, 50 Year Retrospective

Awards

 1975, Julius Hallgarten Award, The National Academy of Design, New York, New York
 1975, Gold Medal of Honor, Allied Artists of American Art, 62nd Annual Exhibition, New York, New York
 1975, First Prize, Salmagundi Club, New York, New York
 1982, John-Young Hunter Memorial Award, Allied Artists of America, 69th Annual Exhibition, New York, New York
 1984, Gold Medal of Honor, Allied Artists of America 71st Annual Exhibition, New York, New York
 1985, John Young Hunter Memorial Award, Allied Artists of America, 76th Annual Exhibition, New York, New York 
 1989, Emily Lowe Award, Allied Artists of America 76th Annual Exhibition, New York, New York
 1991, Emily Lowe Award, Audubon Artists, 49th Annual Exhibition, New York, New York
 1991, Gold Medal of Honor, Allied Artists of America 78th Annual Exhibition, New York, New York
 1992, Beatrice Jackson Humphreys Award, Audubon Artists 50th Annual Exhibition, New York, New York
 1993, Gilmore- Romans Memorial Award, Allied Artists of America 80th Annual Exhibition, New York
 1994, The Stefan Hirsch Memorial Award, Audubon Artists 52nd Annual Exhibition, New York, New York
 1997, First Prize, The National Arts Club 99th Annual Exhibition, New York, New York
 1998, President's Award, Salmagundi Club, New York, New York 
 1998, The Salzman Award, The National Arts Club 100th Annual Exhibition, New York, New York
 1998, Gold Medal of Honor, Audubon Artists 56th Annual Exhibition, New York, New York
 2000, The Alfred Crimi Award, Audubon Artists 58th Annual Exhibition, New York, New York
 2002, First Prize, The Butler Institute of American Art 66th National Midyear Exhibition, Ohio
 2002, Silver Medal of Honor, Audubon Artists, 60th Annual Exhibition, New York, New York 
 2003, Medal for Lifetime Achievement in American Art, The Butler Institute of American Art, Ohio
 2004, Visual Art Award, The National Arts Club 106th Annual Exhibition, New York, New York
 2006, Gold Medal of Honor, Allied Artists of America 93rd Annual Exhibition, New York, New York
 2007, Salmagundi Club Medal of Honor, New York, New York
 2007, Gold Medal of Honor, Allied Artists of America 93rd Annual Exhibition, New York, New York
 2010, Gold Medal of Honor, National Art Museum of Sport, Indiana
 2010, Gold Medal of Honor, Allied Artists of America 97th Annual Exhibition, New York, New York
 2013, Received by the State of New Jersey Senate Resolution by Senator Brian P. Stack
 2013, Received by the City of Union City, County of Hudson, State of New Jersey Proclamation by Mayor Brian P. Stack and the Board of Commissioners
 2013, “Annie Oakley: Little Sure Shot,” The Nutley Historical Museum, Nutley, New Jersey
 2013, First prize, National Juried Trompe l’oeil Exhibition, John F. Peto Studio Museum, Island Heights, New Jersey

References

Living people
1944 births
People from Union City, New Jersey
People from Nutley, New Jersey
People from Weehawken, New Jersey
Painters from New Jersey
American male painters
20th-century American painters
21st-century American painters
21st-century American male artists
Trompe-l'œil artists
20th-century American male artists